This is the discography of English rock band Inspiral Carpets.

Albums

Studio albums

Compilation albums

Video albums

EPs

Demo releases

Singles

Notes

References

Discographies of British artists
Rock music group discographies